AP Columbae, also known as AP Col, is a pre-main-sequence star in the constellation of Columba, which has been studied for the last 15 years, but was recently discovered to be very young and close to Earth. It has been recognized as the closest young star to the Earth.

Discovery
AP Columbae was identified as a flare star in 1995; it was discovered as a bright X-ray source in 1999 during a study of bright infra-red point sources from the 2MASS catalogue which did not have an optical counterpart—one of the reasons for an absence of a counterpart would be a large proper motion, which tends to correlate with proximity. Photometry and spectra taken during that work gave an estimate for the intrinsic brightness of the star, which let to a distance estimate of about 6.1 pc.

A later work confirmed that the star was nearby, and determined that it was very young. It is at a distance of 27 light years (8.4 pc), a figure calculated by accurate observations of the star's relative movement with respect to the background stars during the course of an Earth year. For many years, scientists were of the opinion that such young stars were present only in very distant star-forming regions like the Orion nebula, but with the advent of new all-sky survey techniques this has proved to be incorrect.

Features
AP Columbae is about 40 million years old, which is very young compared to the age of the Earth; it formed after the dinosaurs became extinct and during a period when mammals were beginning to dominate the Earth. The age of the star was estimated by calculating the amount of lithium present in the star, which is rapidly burned up once nuclear fusion ignites.

AP Columbae is classified as a red dwarf of the spectral class M4.5 with an estimated surface temperature of 3250 K. It has not evolved into a main sequence star yet and is still in the pre-main-sequence stage. The star is almost surely single—direct imaging indicated that any stellar companion would be less than 50 milliarcseconds distant, and the radial velocity variations induced by so close a companion would be much larger than the observed ones. It is about 2500 times less luminous than the Sun in the visible light and may be part of a newly formed group of stars called Argus/IC 2391.

AP Columbae belongs to the class of stars known as UV Ceti flare stars. These are young low mass stars, which are strong sources of X-ray radiation and experience frequent flares. The latter are much like Solar flares but are much brighter as compared to the star's quiescent luminosity—the brightness of AP Columbae can increase as much as 10 times during the largest flares.

Since AP Columbae is so close to the Earth, it will be possible to search for any large gas giant planets it possesses using high-resolution images of its immediate neighborhood. Such an approach would not be practical for other, more distant, young stars. Scientists hope to find newly formed planets orbiting the star from observations with the telescopes in Chile. The search for planetary companions has not found any superjovian planets beyond 4.5 AU from the star though.

See also

 Habitability of red dwarf systems
 List of star systems within 25–30 light-years
 Gliese 581
 HD 85512

References

M-type main-sequence stars
Columba (constellation)
Flare stars
Columbae, AP
J06045215-3433360